Laqan (also Romanized as Lāqān) is a village in Jirdeh Rural District, in the Central District of Shaft County, Gilan Province, Iran. At the 2006 census, its population was 460, in 123 families.

References 

Populated places in Shaft County